Felix Matías Villacorta (born 29 March 1997) is an Argentine professional footballer who plays as a forward for Argentino Quilmes.

Career
Villacorta started with San Lorenzo. In August 2017, Primera B Metropolitana side Defensores de Belgrano loaned Villacorta. His professional debut arrived on 2 September against Platense, which was followed by Villacorta scoring his opening career goal in his first start for Defensores de Belgrano during a home loss versus Comunicaciones on 7 October. Fénix loaned Villacorta in June 2018. After scoring goals against Almirante Brown, Defensores Unidos and Sacachispas across 2018–19, Villacorta switched Argentina for Uruguay in July 2019 after signing with Segunda División team Atenas.

Villacorta netted on his starting debut, as Atenas beat Bella Vista 3–0 at the Estadio Atenas on 24 August. Another goal followed in October against Villa Teresa, prior to Villacorta leaving after nine appearances in 2020.

Career statistics
.

References

External links

1997 births
Living people
Footballers from Buenos Aires
Argentine footballers
Association football forwards
Argentine expatriate footballers
Expatriate footballers in Uruguay
Argentine expatriate sportspeople in Uruguay
Argentine Primera División players
Primera B Metropolitana players
Uruguayan Segunda División players
San Lorenzo de Almagro footballers
Defensores de Belgrano footballers
Club Atlético Fénix players
Atenas de San Carlos players